Love & Live is a live video album by Taiwanese singer Jolin Tsai. It was released on October 9, 2009, by Warner and Mars. It chronicled the Butterfly Concert at Taichung Citizen Square in Taichung, Taiwan on May 9, 2009, and the Slow Life Concert at Riverside Live House in Taipei, Taiwan on May 24, 2009. It reached number six on the 2009 video album chart of Five Music in Taiwan.

Background and release 
On March 27, 2009, Tsai released her tenth studio album, Butterfly. On May 9, 2009, Tsai held the Butterfly Concert at Taichung Citizen Square in Taichung, Taiwan. On May 24, 2009, Tsai held the Slow Life Concert at Riverside Live House in Taipei, Taiwan. On October 9, 2009, Tsai released the live video album, Love & Live, which documented both the Butterfly Concert and the Slow Life Concert.

In 2009, it peaked at number one on the weekly video album sales charts of Five Music and G-Music in Taiwan, and it reached number six and number nine on the yearly video album sales charts of Five Music and G-Music, respectively. In 2010, it reached number 10 on the yearly video album sales chart of Five Music.

Track listing

Release history

References

External links 
 

2009 live albums
2009 video albums
Jolin Tsai live albums
Jolin Tsai video albums
Warner Music Taiwan live albums
Warner Music Taiwan video albums